The 2005 Baltimore Orioles season involved the Orioles finishing 4th in the American League East with a record of 74 wins and 88 losses.  The team started off hot, compiling a record of 42 wins and 30 losses while spending 62 days in first place in AL East.  After June 23, the team started slipping on the way to a losing record and manager Lee Mazzilli's dismissal in early August.

Offseason
 December 7, 2004: B.J. Surhoff was signed as a free agent with the Baltimore Orioles.
January 18, 2005: Midre Cummings was signed as a free agent with the Baltimore Orioles.
 February 2, 2005: Sammy Sosa was traded by the Chicago Cubs with cash to the Baltimore Orioles for Jerry Hairston, Mike Fontenot, and Dave Crouthers (minors).

Regular season

Season standings

Record vs. opponents

Season summary
The Baltimore Orioles were in contention up to the all-star break, in second place, posting a record of 47–40. The Orioles trailed the Red Sox by just 2 games. The Orioles, however, posted a 27–48 record after the all-star break, finishing 21 games behind the Boston Red Sox and the New York Yankees.

Transactions
June 8, 2005: Eli Marrero was traded by the Kansas City Royals for minor leaguer Pete Maestrales.
July 30, 2005: Eric Byrnes was traded by the Colorado Rockies to the Baltimore Orioles for Larry Bigbie.
August 11, 2005: Midre Cummings was released by the Baltimore Orioles.

Roster

Player stats

Batting

Starters by position
Note: Pos = Position; G = Games played; AB = At bats; H = Hits; Avg. = Batting average; HR = Home runs; RBI = Runs batted in

Other batters
Note: G = Games played; AB = At bats; H = Hits; Avg. = Batting average; HR = Home runs; RBI = Runs batted in

Pitching

Starting pitchers 
Note: G = Games pitched; IP = Innings pitched; W = Wins; L = Losses; ERA = Earned run average; SO = Strikeouts

Other pitchers 
Note: G = Games pitched; IP = Innings pitched; W = Wins; L = Losses; ERA = Earned run average; SO = Strikeouts

Relief pitchers 
Note: G = Games pitched; W = Wins; L = Losses; SV = Saves; ERA = Earned run average; SO = Strikeouts

Farm system
LEAGUE CHAMPIONS: Frederick

References

2005 Baltimore Orioles team at Baseball-Reference
2005 Baltimore Orioles season at baseball-almanac.com

Baltimore Orioles seasons
Baltimore Orioles season
Baltimore